Joaquín Cosío Osuna (born 6 October 1962) is a Mexican actor and poet.  He is best known for roles such as Rubén "Mascarita" in Matando Cabos (2004), General Medrano in Quantum of Solace (2008), Ernesto Fonseca Carrillo in Narcos: Mexico (2018–2021) and Major General Mateo Suárez in The Suicide Squad (2021), among others.

Life and career 

Cosío began his theatrical career in the early 1980s.
He made his film debut in 2001 in the film The Blue Room and he has participated in over 30 feature films and several shorts. Cosío played a character named Hector, a multi-episode role in the HBO comedy Eastbound & Down.  He played General Medrano, one of the main villains in the James Bond film Quantum of Solace, and acted alongside Benicio del Toro in Oliver Stone's gritty thriller, Savages. Cosío appeared in Robert Duvall's A Night in Old Mexico, and in Disney's 2013 film The Lone Ranger. He played Don Neto in Narcos: Mexico in 2018.  He played Casimiro "Pop" Morales in Netflix’s Gentefied from 2020 to 2021.

Awards
He was nominated for the Mexican Academy of Film Awards, the Ariel Awards, three times: in 2005 for his portrayal of the lovable and ruthless "Mascarita" in the Mexican box office hit Matando Cabos, in 2011 for his work in the film El Infierno for which he won his first Ariel and also the National Board of Cinema's award for Best Actor. His most recent Ariel nomination was in 2012 for his work in Pastorela. In 2012, he became the first Mexican recipient of the MGM My Favorite Award, which was created to honor international motion picture artists and with the purpose to ensure that great accomplishments from the international film-making industry professionals are recognized.

Filmography

Film

La habitación azul (2002) – Maestro de Obras
Una de dos (2002) – Tío Luis
Sin ton ni Sonia (2003) – Coronel Astorga
Matando Cabos (2004) – Rubén "Mascarita"
Hugoool (2004, Short) – The Commandment
La afición somos todos (2004, Short) – Apostador
El otro José (2005, Short)
Un mundo maravilloso (2006) – Vagabundo
Efectos secundarios (2006) – Conductor
La sangre iluminada (2007) – Isaías
La verdadera pasión (2007, Short)
Segurança Nacional (2007) – Héctor Gasca
Violonchelo (2008) – Agente Salas
El viaje de Teo (2008) – Manlio
Arráncame la vida (2008) – Juan
Quantum of Solace (2008) – General Medrano
Rudo y Cursi (2008) – Arnulfo
Backyard (2009) – Peralta
Me importas tú... y tú (2009)
El mar muerto (2010) – Arturo
Sucedió en un día (2010) – Juan (segment "La historia del hombre que nunca fue Consalero")
Segurança Nacional (2010) – Hector Gasca
El Infierno (2010) – El Cochiloco
Te Presentó a Laura (2010) – Guadalupe
Salvando al soldado Pérez (2011) – Rosalío Mendoza
Entre la noche y el día (2011)
A Better Life (2011) – Blasco Martinez
Pastorela (2011) – Agent Jesus Juarez
La revolución de Juan Escopeta (2011) – Juan Escopeta (voice)
Marcelo (2012) – Nico
Savages (2012) – El Azul
La vida precoz y breve de Sabina Rivas (2012) – Burrona
El Santos vs. La Tetona Mendoza (2012) – Police Officer (voice)
Las paredes hablan (2012) – Carlín
El Arribo de Conrado Sierra (2012) – Don Chalio
Bless Me, Ultima (2013) – Narciso
The Lone Ranger (2013) – Jesus
A Night in Old Mexico (2013) – Cholo
Jirón de Niebla (2013) – Vega
Familia Gang (2014) – Escolta Coyote 1
Cantinflas (2014) – Emilio 'Indio' Fernández
The Perfect Dictatorship (2014) – Agustín Morales
Heriberto y Demetrio (2014) – Heriberto
The Thin Yellow Line (2015) – Gabriel
Hot Pursuit (2015) – Vicente Cortez
Villa, itinerario de una pasión (2015) – Abraham Gonzalez
Las Aparicio (2015) – Camilo Gutiérrez
Compadres (2016)
Sundown (2016) – Pedro
Me gusta, pero me asusta (2017) – Don Gumaro
Belzebuth (2017) – Emmanuel Ritter
Cinderelo (2017)
Spider-Man: Into the Spider-Verse (2018) – The Scorpion (voice)
Sonora, the Devil's Highway (2018) – Emeterio
Rambo: Last Blood (2019) – Don Manuel
The Suicide Squad (2021) – Mateo Suárez, Major General

Television
 Los Plateados (2005) – Kamal Bashur
 Sexo y otros secretos (2007) – Vicente
 Los héroes del norte (2010) – Don Hassan
 Eastbound & Down (2011; 3 episodes) – Hector
 Mentir para vivir (2013) – Joaquín Barragán
 The Strain (2015–16; 17 episodes) – Angel Guzman Hurtado / The Silver Angel
 Narcos: Mexico (2018–20; 11 episodes) – Ernesto 'Don Neto' Fonseca Carrillo
 El Candidato (2020; 10 episodes) – Rafael Bautista
 Gentefied (2020–present; 18 episodes) – Casimiro "Pop" Morales
  Maya and the Three  (2021) – Camazotz (voice)

References

External links

Ariel Award winners
Living people
Mexican male film actors
Mexican male telenovela actors
Mexican male voice actors
Male actors from Nayarit
1962 births